Elbow Lake is a lake in Grant County, in the U.S. state of Minnesota.

History
Elbow Lake was so named because its outline is shaped like an elbow.

See also
List of lakes in Minnesota

References

Lakes of Minnesota
Lakes of Grant County, Minnesota